Islamic Economic Systems is a 1994 book by Ali Rahnema and Farhad Nomani  in which the authors examine "the central tenets of Islamic economics, both in theory and in practice". It has been translated into Bosnian and Malaysian.

Reception
The book has received positive reviews in Digest of Middle East Studies and Islamic Studies.

See also
History of Islamic economics
Islamic economics in Pakistan

References

External links 
The Secular Miracle: Religion, Politics, and Economic Policy in Iran

1994 non-fiction books
English-language books
Islamic economics
Zed Books books